Ivan Davis (16 April 1937 – 13 March 2020) was a Unionist politician in Northern Ireland who served as an Ulster Unionist Party (UUP) Member of the Northern Ireland Assembly (MLA) for Lagan Valley from 1998 to 2003.

Born in Lisburn, Davis was elected to Lisburn Borough Council in 1973, representing the Democratic Unionist Party (DUP).  He was also elected to represent South Antrim at the 1982 Northern Ireland Assembly election.

In 1987, Davis resigned from the DUP and instead joined the Ulster Unionist Party (UUP). Under this new party label, he served as Mayor of Lisburn from 1991 – 93. He was also elected for Lagan Valley at the Northern Ireland Forum election in 1996 (with Jeffrey Donaldson and David Campbell), and narrowly held this seat at the 1998 Assembly election. During the course of the Assembly, he became UUP chief whip.

Lagan Valley UUP controversially did not select Davis as a candidate for the 2003 Assembly election, so he resigned and stood instead as an independent Unionist.  He received 2,223 first-preference votes, but this did not prove sufficient to see him elected despite polling more first preferences than one successful candidate.

Despite this, Davis continued to sit as a UUP member, and leader of the UUP group, on Lisburn City Council until 2011.

He died on 13 March 2020, aged 82.

References

Bibliography
Biography – Ivan Davis, Northern Ireland Assembly

1937 births
Northern Ireland MPAs 1982–1986
Mayors of places in Northern Ireland
Members of the Northern Ireland Forum
Northern Ireland MLAs 1998–2003
Democratic Unionist Party politicians
Ulster Unionist Party MLAs
Independent politicians in Northern Ireland
People from Lisburn
Politicians from County Antrim
2020 deaths